Tenczynek is a small village in southern Poland, situated in the Lesser Poland Voivodeship, in Gmina Krzeszowice, about 25 km west of the city of Kraków.

It gives its name to the protected area called Tenczynek Landscape Park.

Religions
 Parish, Roman Catholicism
 Congregation, Jehovah's Witnesses

References

Villages in Kraków County